Ultra.2009 is a dance compilation album from Ultra Records, compiling original and remixed tracks from the label. It was released on October 28, 2008.

Track listing 
Disc One:
"Break the Ice (Kaskade Remix)" - Britney Spears
"Pocketful of Sunshine (Stonebridge Radio Mix)" - Natasha Bedingfield
"Shake It (Lenny B Remix)" - Metro Station
"All I Ever Wanted (DJ Alex Extended Mix)" - Basshunter
"Faded (Extended)" - Cascada
"You Make Me Feel″ - AnnaGrace
"Everytime We Touch" - David Guetta & Chris Willis with Steve Angello and Sebastian Ingrosso
"Behind (Callea Club Mix)" - Flanders
"Hot Summer Night (Extended)" - David Tavaré & 2 Eivissa
"The One (Vocal Mix)" - Sharam & Daniel Bedingfield
"No Stress (Original Club Mix)" - Laurent Wolf
"Cry for You" - September

Disc Two:
"Down Down Down (Nerio's Dubwork Mix)" - No-Tone & Inusa Dawuda
"By Your Side (Original Extended)" - Yves Larock & Jaba
"Watch Out (Extended Mix)" - Alex Gaudino & Shena
"Squeeze Me (The Trevor Loveys Skeezer Pleezer Jam)" - Kraak & Smaak feat. Ben Westbeech
"Licky (Hervé Goes Low Remix)" - Larry Tee & Princess Superstar
"In and Out of Love (Extended)" - Armin van Buuren feat. Sharon den Adel
"Feel Your Love" - Kim Sozzi
"Come Fly Away (Soha & Adam K Remix)" - Benny Benassi feat. Channing
"Buttons (Jimmy Vallance Remix)" - Sia
"Move For Me (Extended Mix)" - Kaskade & Deadmau5

References

2008 compilation albums
Ultra Records albums